"Save Myself" is a song by English singer-songwriter Ed Sheeran. It was included on the deluxe edition of his third studio album ÷ (2017) and is the sixteenth and the closing track. It was written by Amy Wadge, Ed Sheeran and Labrinth with Sheeran and Labrinth handling the production. After the album's release it charted at number 19 on the UK Singles Chart, despite not being an official single.

Critical reception
Celeb Mix writer Ellie Doe-Demosse stated: "And to end such a beautiful, banger of an album we end with Save Myself, which is another touching song. What we love most about Save Myself is the message that it promotes – there are days you’ll be in a dark place and you’ll feel like you’ve hit rock bottom, and on those days you still put people’s happiness before your own, but there will come a time where you need to think of yourself before thinking of others, because eventually you’ll feel washed up, taken advantage of, and used."

Charts and certifications

Weekly charts

Certifications

References

2017 songs
Songs written by Ed Sheeran
Ed Sheeran songs
Songs written by Amy Wadge
Songs written by Labrinth